Alcidion inornatum is a species of longhorn beetles of the subfamily Lamiinae. It was described by Monne and Monne in 2007, and is known from Colombia.

References

Beetles described in 2007
Endemic fauna of Colombia
Alcidion